Gorgopis armillata is a moth of the family Hepialidae. It is known from South Africa.

References

Moths described in 1921
Hepialidae